Farmington is an unincorporated settlement in the Peace Country of northeastern British Columbia, Canada, located at the confluence of Coal Creek and the Kiskatinaw River.

References

Peace River Country
Unincorporated settlements in British Columbia